Ghoul Trouble is a novel by John Passarella set in the fictional universe of the TV series Buffy the Vampire Slayer.

Summary
A new vampire arrives in town who walks outside during the day and yet does not seem to be affected by the sun's rays. The vampire, called Solitaire, is here to challenge the Slayer. He wants to reassure himself that he can beat a Slayer in physical combat. He is an old vampire and Giles struggles with his research. At the same time a band called Vyxn arrives at the Bronze and plays for four nights straight. Vyxn is made up of four girls who appear to be not quite human, especially when they seem to be turning all the males at the Bronze into slobbering idiots and bending them to their will. Xander is especially taken by them and would do anything to help them out. Buffy and the gang need to figure out what Vyxn is in town for, and why Solitaire can walk in the sun.

It is later discovered that Vyxn are a group of ghouls that lure men to their deaths (and it is hinted vampires) at will through their voice. Giles and the others rescue Xander from them just prior to Buffy's final fight with Solitaire.

Solitaire it is discovered is immune to sunlight because he is not actually a vampire, he is a full-blooded demon, that can shift forms between human and demon, and the halfway mark looks remarkably like a vampire. Buffy decapitates him with an axe.

Continuity

Supposed to be set during third season of Buffy the Vampire Slayer.

Canonical issues

Buffy novels, such as this one are not considered by most fans as part of canon. They are usually not considered as official Buffyverse reality, but are novels from the authors' imaginations. However unlike fanfic, 'overviews' summarising their story, written early in the writing process, were 'approved' by both Fox and Whedon (or his office), and the books were therefore later published as officially Buffy merchandise.

External links

Reviews
Litefoot1969.bravepages.com - Review of this book by Litefoot
Nika-summers.com - Review of this book by Nika Summers
Shadowcat.name - Review of this book

2000 American novels
Books based on Buffy the Vampire Slayer